10 HD is an Australian free-to-air television channel that was originally launched on 16 December 2007 on channel 1. The channel was available to high definition digital television viewers through Network 10 owned-and-operated stations. The multichannel broadcast live sport, entertainment, films, documentaries, science fiction and news. The channel ceased broadcasting on 25 March 2009, and the following day was replaced by One HD (now known as 10 Bold).

Following the government's decision to remove the SD Primary Channel limitations, the channel restored as an HD simulcast on 2 March 2016 on channel 13. On 16 September 2020, Network 10 moved 10 HD to digital channels 1 and 15 following the addition of 10 Shake from 27 September 2020. To make room for this, 10 Bold's HD feed closed down and 10 Bold was reduced to two standard definition (SD) feeds.

History

Origins
From 2002, this was interspersed with a loop of high definition demonstration material during business hours, for viewing in the showrooms of television retailers, at the conclusion of an equivalent service by Network Ten.

Breakaway era
Ten HD was officially announced on 14 September 2007, to replace Network Ten's existing high definition service, a simulcast of its standard definition and analogue services, through the use of an amendment to the Broadcasting Services Act 1992 in 2006. The Broadcasting Legislation Amendment (Digital Television) Act 2006 permitted television networks to launch digital multichannels, provided that they are broadcast exclusively in high definition.

Although originally expected to be the first free-to-air commercial television channel introduced to metropolitan areas since 1988, the surprise launch of Seven Media Group's HD offering, 7HD, on 15 October 2007, two months before transmissions were scheduled to begin, meant that Ten HD was launched as the second high-definition multichannel in Australia. PBL Media announced the creation of a similar multichannel, 9HD, on 27 September, which was launched on 17 March 2008.

Ten's parent company, and shareholder in metropolitan ratings system OzTAM, Ten Network Holdings Limited, began discussions with the ratings system operator to have digital multichannels, such as 10HD and ABC TV Plus, included in television ratings for the first time on 17 September 2007. As well as this, on the same day, it was announced that the national weekend editions of 10 News First would be timeshifted from 10 onto Ten HD, an hour delayed at 6 pm, to directly compete with Seven News and Nine News. This would have seen 10 News First formally broadcast at 6 pm for the first time since 1992, however, the timeslot was later amended to 5.30 pm.

In preparation for the launch of 10 HD, Ten's digital terrestrial channel line-up was updated on 19 November 2007, with changes consisting of LCN1 redirecting Network 10's current high-definition simulcast. Following this, on 21 November 2007, Ten Network Holdings Limited announced that it would launch the channel on 16 December 2007 at 5.00 pm, with the first program, Totally Wild.

Opening night
Ten HD officially commenced transmission on 16 December 2007 from the network's five metropolitan owned-and-operated stations in Sydney, Melbourne, Brisbane, Adelaide, and Perth. Prior to the official launch, at 5.00 pm the first program, Totally Wild, was broadcast. Following this, for the first time since 1992, 10 News First and Sports Tonight were broadcast in direct competition with Seven News and Nine News, timeshifted by thirty minutes to 5.30 pm and 6.00 pm respectively.

The first official program on launch night began at 8.30 pm, the 2001 movie Black Hawk Down. This was followed by Bon Jovi's Lost Highway Tour at 11.30 pm and Video Hits Presents: The Music of Supernatural at 12.25 am. Video Hits Up-Late marked the end of the first night of transmission for 10HD at 12.50 am.

In the lead-up to the opening night, the channel promised up to eleven hours of time-shifted programming from Ten in addition to fifty hours of exclusive programming, which included live sport, entertainment, films, documentaries, science fiction and news. This consisted of six movies per week, in addition to National Geographic documentaries in the afternoon, from 3pm to 5pm, music-oriented programming following the Sunday Night Movie, along with a primetime breakaway schedule on Thursdays and from 10.30 pm to 11.30 pm Monday to Wednesday.

In addition to high definition broadcasting on channel 1, a high definition simulcast of 10HD was provided on channel 12 alongside a standard definition simulcast on channel 11 as Ten SD2.

Full simulcast and launch of 10 Bold
From 2009, commercial networks in Australia were allowed to broadcast a standard definition subchannel. Rather than introduce a new digital service, Ten decided to relaunch Ten HD as a sports-only channel, to be named One HD (now 10 Bold), and use its standard definition simulcast on channel 11 to broadcast a standard definition simulcast called One SD. Before One HD's official launch, most breakaway programming shown on Ten HD ceased from 1 January 2009, and only showed a high-definition broadcast of the existing Ten digital service, along with a few sports-based breakaway programs. Ten HD officially shut down on 25 March 2009, with One HD (now 10 Bold) launching the following day.

2016 revival
After the Nine Network restarted broadcasting 9HD in November 2015, 10 confirmed that it was working on rebroadcasting Ten HD. However, they did not put a time frame on it, stating that they are "working through some technical and rights issues". On 11 February 2016, some smart TVs began receiving notification messages advising of 10HD through a "ghost broadcast" that soon disappeared.

Ten later recommenced simulcasting in high definition on 2 March 2016 on channel 13 from 3pm, in time for the 2016 season of the Virgin Australia Supercars Championship. As a result, One was reduced to a standard definition broadcast on both channel 1 and channel 12. Ten uses MPEG-4 technology to broadcast Ten HD.

Upon the regional media shakeup on 1 July 2016 where WIN Television replaced Southern Cross Austereo as Ten's primary regional affiliate network, WIN's high definition simulcast on channel 80, WIN HD, became Ten HD's regional counterpart.

NRN in Northern New South Wales carried 10HD from 21 September 2016 under Southern Cross' ownership. The station would sell off to WIN by 31 May 2017, keeping the 10 branding until playout and transmission were transferred to WIN's MediaHub facility the following September.

Programming

Ten HD broadcast programming consisting of news, live sporting events, entertainment, films, documentaries and science fiction. In addition to this, themed programming line-ups were broadcast on specified days, including Sci-Fi Saturday. The channel provided fifty hours of exclusive content per week including up to eleven hours of time-shifted programming from Ten, as well as additional programming from popular Ten franchises such as Australian Idol, The Biggest Loser, and So You Think You Can Dance.

Overseas programming on Ten HD included; Psych, Battlestar Galactica, Cane, Conviction, Eureka, Friday Night Lights, Journeyman, One Tree Hill, Over There, Smallville, The 4400, The Bold and the Beautiful, The Shield and Veronica Mars. In the late evenings a mixture exclusive series, movies and encore screenings of series were broadcast. Late-night series broadcast included The X-Files, Charmed, JAG, Buffy the Vampire Slayer, Angel, NYPD Blue and Sex and the City. In addition to this, high-definition documentaries from the National Geographic Channel and Granada Television screened on weekdays from 3 pm to 5 pm.

News

To compete directly with Seven News and Nine News, Ten HD broadcast local editions of Ten News, timeshifted by half an hour, on weekdays at 5.30 pm, allowing the second half of the bulletin to compete with the offerings from the other commercial networks. On weekends, the national bulletin was delayed by half an hour at 5.30 pm and Sports Tonight followed at 6.00 pm.

Ten HD simulcast the Early News and Morning News, 6 am and 11 am respectively. It did not simulcast Late News but instead showed exclusive programming from 10.30 pm, with a drama series and then a late movie, followed by repeats of Video Hits Up-Late specials.

Sport

10 Sport broadcast live or near live exclusive and simulcast sporting events on 10HD. These included NASCAR Sprint Cup Series, NASCAR Nationwide Series, Formula One, MotoGP, the NFL, the Indian Premier League, the World Golf Championships, the WGC-Bridgestone Invitational, the Mission Hills World Cup and the New Zealand PGA Championship.

In addition to this, the Australian Football League was simulcast on the channel, with all of Ten's games filmed in high definition.

Formula One Grand Prix and MotoGP races were televised on 10HD, usually on tape delay.

Most of 10HD's sports content was kept after it was relaunched as 10 Bold.

Availability

Original channel
In its former inception, Ten HD was available exclusively in 1080i high definition from the network's five metropolitan owned-and-operated stations, TEN Sydney, ATV Melbourne, TVQ Brisbane, ADS Adelaide, and NEW Perth. The breakaway programming was never available outside of the metropolitan areas, although Southern Cross Ten had planned to rebroadcast the service from mid-2009: it instead launched the One service. Foxtel added the channel to its line up for cable customers in June 2008, when the subscription television provider launched its Foxtel HD+ service.

Revival channel
Ten HD is available exclusively in 1080i high definition.

Upon its revival on 2 March 2016, Ten HD returned to 1080i50 high definition, but was broadcast in MPEG-4 format as opposed to the standard MPEG-2 format. Ten HD covers all Ten-owned metropolitan stations as well as the Gold Coast (covered by its Brisbane station). It is also available to regional viewers via Southern Cross and it’s joint-ventures on channel 50 for Southern NSW, regional Victoria, regional Queensland, Tasmania, Broken Hill and Spencer Gulf and via WIN Television and it’s joint ventures on channel 50 in Eastern SA, regional WA and Northern NSW and the Gold Coast.

On 16 September 2020 in Metropolitan areas, 10 HD moved from Channel 13 to Channel 15 due to the impending launch of Network 10's third digital channel 10 Shake.

Logo history

Ten HD (2007–09, 2016–18)

2007–2009: The World is Amazing in HD / My Ten HD
2016–2018: Turn on 10.

10 HD (2018–present)

31 October 2018 – 23 October 2019: TV with a Twist
23 October 2019 – 1 August 2020: Now You're Talking
15 October 2020 – present: There's No Place Like 10

See also

List of digital television channels in Australia
High-definition television in Australia

References

Network 10
English-language television stations in Australia
Television channels and stations established in 2007
Television channels and stations disestablished in 2009
Television channels and stations established in 2016
Digital terrestrial television in Australia
High-definition television